Godyris is a genus of clearwing (ithomiine) butterflies, named by Jean Baptiste Boisduval in 1870. They are in the brush-footed butterfly family, Nymphalidae.

Species
Arranged alphabetically:
Godyris cleomella (Hewitson, 1874)
Godyris crinippa (Hewitson, 1874)
Godyris dircenna (C. & R. Felder, [1865])
Godyris duillia (Hewitson, 1854)
Godyris kedema (Hewitson, 1855)
Godyris lauta (Haensch, 1910)
Godyris mantura (Hewitson, 1876)
Godyris nepos (Weymer, 1875)
Godyris nero (Hewitson, 1855)
Godyris nubilosa Brabant, 2004
Godyris panthyale (C. & R. Felder, 1862)
Godyris sappho (Haensch, 1910)
Godyris zavaleta (Hewitson, 1855)

References 

Ithomiini
Nymphalidae of South America
Nymphalidae genera
Taxa named by Jean Baptiste Boisduval